XPL may refer to:

Computing 
 XPL, a dialect of the PL/I programming language, developed in 1967, used for the development of compilers for computer languages
 XPL Protocol, an open protocol intended to permit the control and monitoring of home automation devices
 XML Pipeline Language, a dataflow-oriented XML processing language
 .xpl, a filename extension used for XProc script/pipeline
 .xpl, a HDi playlist file extension

Places 
 XPL, an IATA code for Soto Cano Air Base
 XPL, an ICAO code for Express Line Aircompany

Other 
 Spirit XPL, a Gibson Spirit guitar model
 XPL, an abbreviation for cross-polarized light